Reid Klopp (born 2 June 1984 in Salisbury) is a US-born US Virgin Islands soccer player, who currently plays for Free Will Baptist.

Club career
He started playing soccer at Parkside High School in Salisbury, Maryland and played 4 years of college soccer for Salisbury Sea Gulls. Since moving to the Virgin Islands for his work at a Christian outreach for school kids called Free Will Baptist. He plays in the local soccer league for a team that represents the Free Will Baptist organization.

International career
He made his debut for the US Virgin Islands in a July 2011 World Cup qualification match against the British Virgin Islands in which he immediately scored. He was also on the scoresheet in the reverse, making history in the process since it was the first time the US Virgin Islands reached the next round in World Cup qualification.

International goals 
Scores and results list US Virgin Islands's goal tally first, score column indicates score after each Klopp goal.

See also 
 List of top international men's football goalscorers by country

References

External links

1984 births
Living people
People from Salisbury, Maryland
Association football midfielders
United States Virgin Islands soccer players
United States Virgin Islands international soccer players
College men's soccer players in the United States
Soccer players from Maryland
Salisbury Sea Gulls athletes